A Divorce Before Marriage is an album by the band I Like Trains. Released on 2 December 2016, the album is the soundtrack for the film A Divorce Before Marriage, a documentary about the band by Matt Hopkins and Ben Lankester.

Track listing
 "Bethesda" - 7:59
 "Tennyson" - 4:48
 "Wharfe" - 4:10
 "Elbe" - 2:43
 "X" - 9:44
 "North" - 7:11
 "A Misspent Youth" - 4:10
 "Lock 19" - 4:06
 "Aire" - 5:36
 "Ilkley Moor" - 10:56
 "Severn Bridge" - 3:12

References

2016 soundtrack albums
I Like Trains albums